The 1997 California Golden Bears football team was an American football team that represented the University of California, Berkeley in the Pacific-10 Conference (Pac-10) during the 1997 NCAA Division I-A football season. In their first year under head coach Tom Holmoe, the Golden Bears compiled a 3–8 record (1–7 against Pac-10 opponents), finished in ninth place in the Pac-10, and were outscored by their opponents by a combined score of 339 to 295. Home games were played at California Memorial Stadium in Berkeley, California.

The team's statistical leaders included Justin Vedder with 2,718 passing yards, Tarik Smith with 636 rushing yards, and Bobby Shaw with 1,093 receiving yards.

Schedule

Roster
LB Matt Beck 
Jerry DeLoach (defense)
WR Dameane Douglas
Chidi Iwuoma (Fr, defense)
Deltha O'Neal
Bruce Pierre (offense)
Kato Serwanga (defense)
WR Bobby Shaw
Marquise Smith (defense)
Brian Surgener (offense)
QB Justin Vedder

Season summary

Arizona
Dameane Douglas 12 Rec, 143 Yds

at Stanford

100th meeting

References

California
California Golden Bears football seasons
California Golden Bears football